Backup Interceptor Control (BUIC) was the Electronic Systems Division 416M System to backup the SAGE 416L System in the United States and Canada.  BUIC deployed Cold War command, control, and coordination systems to SAGE radar stations to create dispersed NORAD Control Centers.



Background
Prior to the SAGE Direction Centers becoming operational, the USAF deployed data link systems at NORAD Control Centers with ground computers for controlling manned interceptors.  After SAGE IBM AN/FSQ-7 Combat Direction Centrals became operational and the Super Combat Centers with improved (digital) computers were cancelled, a backup to SAGE was planned in the event the above-ground SAGE Air Defense Direction Center failed.

General Electric AN/GPA-37 Course Directing Group
BUIC began with deployment of General Electric AN/GPA-37 Course Directing Groups to several Long Range Radar stations.  Units designated included the "U.S. Air Force 858th Air Defense Group (BUIC) [which became] a permanent operating facility" at Naval Air Station Fallon in Nevada.

BUIC II
BUIC II was used to command and control sites using the Burroughs AN/GSA-51 Radar Course Directing Group. North Truro AFS became the first ADC installation configured for BUIC II.

BUIC III
The AN/GYK-19 (initially AN/GSA-51A) was an upgraded version of the BUIC II system designated AN/GSA-51A and required a larger building than the AN/GSA-51.  The first BUIC III site was Fort Fisher AFS, and Air Defense Command's was first installed at Fort Fisher Air Force Station, North Carolina.

Although more advanced systems were contemplated, the final design of the BUIC III system was an upgraded version of the BUIC II with around twice the performance.

Closure and upgrade
In 1972 the USAF decided to shut down most of the BUIC sites; most of the sites mothballed by 1974, except for the BUIC III site at Tyndall Air Force Base. In Canada the BUIC site at Senneterre was shut down, but St Margarets remained open. The remaining sites were closed between 1983-1984 when SAGE was replaced by the Joint Surveillance System.

The AN/FYQ-47 Common Digitizer for the Joint Surveillance System, and the Radar Video Data Processor (RVDP) was a combined system for the Air Force and Federal Aviation Administration (FAA), it replaced the SAGE Burroughs AN/FST-2 Coordinate Data Transmitting Sets.

References

External links
 AN/GSA-51 Back Up Interceptor Control System (BUIC) at Federation of American Scientists
 Burroughs BUIC - AN/GSA-51 SAGE Backup at Southwest Museum of Engineering, Communications and Computation

Computer networks
Cold War military equipment of the United States
Lists of Cold War sites
North American Aerospace Defense Command